Suure-Aru Nature Reserve is a nature reserve which is located in Harju County, Estonia.

The area of the nature reserve is 703 ha.

The protected area was founded in 2014 to protect valuable habitat types and threatened species in Kabila village (Kernu Parish), in Tuula village (Saue Parish) and in Ohtu village (Keila Parish).

References

Nature reserves in Estonia
Geography of Harju County